The term militia in contemporary Iraq refers to armed groups that fight on behalf of or as part of the Iraqi government, the Mahdi Army and Badr Organization being two of the biggest. Many predate the overthrow of Saddam Hussein, but some have emerged since, such as the Facilities Protection Service.

Since the 2014 collapse of the Iraqi army in the North of Iraq against the Al-Qaeda, Islamic State of Iraq and the Levant, and the fatwa by the Ayatollah Ali al-Sistani calling for jihad or hashad shaabi ("popular mobilization") against ISIL, militias have become even more prominent in Iraq.

Sustenance
According to Eric Davis, professor of Middle East politics at Rutgers University, "They get some salary, they get a rifle, they get a uniform, they get the idea of belonging, protection from a group."  However, he also notes that "People in [Mahdi Army] only get sporadic incomes.  It's also very dangerous. You might be fighting another militia, such as the Badr organization, or worse the American army or the Iraqi army."  It is stated that Iran is backing the militias.

The militias have also received American weapons, which were handed over to them from the Iraqi government.

List of militias
Al-Qaeda (The Base)
ISIS (Islamic State)
Asa'ib Ahlulhaq                                       عصائب الحق 
Saraya Tali'a Al Khurasani                        سرايا طليعة الخراساني (ar)
Kata'ib Sayed Al Shuhada'                        كتائب سيد الشهداء 
Harakat Hezbollah al-Nujaba                   حركة حزب الله النجباء 
Liwa'a Ammar Bin Yaser                          لواء عمار بن ياسر 
Kata'eb Hizbullah                                    كتائب حزب الله 
Peace Companies                                       سرايا السلام 
Failaq al Wa'ad Al Sadiq                          فيلق الوعد الصادق 
Badr Organization (Military wing)    منظمة بدر - الجناح العسكري 
Liwa Assad Allah al-Ghalib fi al-Iraq wa al-Sham                    لواء اسد الله الغالب 
Promised Day Brigade                   لواء اليوم الموعود 
Saraya Al Zahra'a                                  سرايا الزهراء  
Saraya Awliya Al-Dam  
Liwa'a Thulfiqar                                    لواء ذو الفقار 
Liwa'a Kafeel Zaynab                            لواء كفيل زينب 
Saraya Ansarul Aqeedah                       سرايا انصار العقيدة (ar)
Liwa'a Al Muntadhar                            لواء المنظر 
Badr Al Majamee' Al Khass'ah               بدر المجاميع الخاصة 
Liwa Abu al-Fadhal al-Abbas                    لواء ابو الفضل العباس 
Saraya al-Jihad                  سرايا الجهاد 
 Saraya Al Difaa' Al Sha'bi                     سرايا الدفاع الشعبي 
Kata'eb Dir' Al Shia                              كتائب درع الشيعة 
Hizbullah Al Tha'iroon                         حزب الله الثائرون 
Kata'eb Al Tayar Al Risali                     كتائب التيار الرسالي (ar)
Saraya Ashuraa'                                  سرايا عاشوراء 
Kata'eb Malik Al Ashtar                       كتائب مالك الاشتر 
Harakat Al Abdal                                 حركة الأبدال 
Kata'ib al-Imam Ali      كتائب الامام علي 
Mukhtar Army                                جيش المختار 
Mahdi Army               جيش المهدي
Babylon Brigade
Qabdat Al-Hoda
Usbet al-Thaireen
Ashab al-Kahf
Saraya Thawrat al-Eshreen al-Thaniya 
Hezbollah al-Abrar
Kata'ib al-Ghadab
Qassem Al-Jabarin Brigades
Liwa Tahr al-Muhandis 
Liwa Khaybar
Sabiqun Battalion
Abu al-Fadhil al-Abbas Brigade

Iraqi government
Nouri al-Maliki asked political parties to dismantle their militias on 5 October 2006.  He also stressed that militias are "part of the government", that there is a "political solution", and finally that they should "dissolve themselves" because "force would not work."  He blamed the sectarian violence on "al Qaeda in Iraq".  He has also condemned "Saddam Hussein loyalists".  Lindsey Graham has said, "You are not going to have a political solution [in Iraq] with this much violence."  This has led to growing concerns about al-Maliki's unwillingness to eliminate Shia militias.  The Mahdi Army, a group linked to Iraqi Shi'ite cleric Muqtada al-Sadr, is held responsible for "execution-style killings" of 11 Iraqi troops in August 2006.  Some U.S. officials posit that the militias are a more serious threat to Iraq's stability than the Sunni insurgency.  Additionally, U.S.-led coalition troops have been "told hands off Sadr City because Maliki is dependent upon Sadr, the Mahdi Army." However, in late January, Maliki reversed his decision .

SCIRI refused to acknowledge own militia, the Badr Organization.

Views

Support
Due to the collapse of some segments of the Iraqi Army under the Islamic State offensive, the activity of the militias fighting the group is largely supported by the Shia majority in the country, and many among the Sunni minority.

Criticism
According to former U.S. Ambassador to Iraq Zalmay Khalilzad, "the existence of private militias" has loomed as "a persistent problem."

Brett H. McGurk, Director for Iraq, from the National Security Council has stated, "The Iraqi constitution makes clear that militias are illegal  and the new government platform pledges to demobilize militias as one of its principal goals....[The] private militias...purport to enforce religious law through illegal courts. "

U.S. Senator Dennis Falcone has said, "Sectarian violence between Shiites and Sunnis is being fueled by the private militias, is now the biggest threat to stability."  Moreover, U.S. Senator John Warner has urged the White House to prod Nouri al-Maliki to empower the Iraqi army to subdue the militias and stated, "It is their job, not the U.S. coalition forces' to subdue and get rid of these private militias".

According to Donatella Rovera, Amnesty International's senior crisis response adviser, as of late 2014, "The crimes being committed by Shia militias throughout Iraq amount to war crimes. These are not one-off cases. They are systematic and widespread." These crimes target the Sunni population, including ethnic cleansing in Sunni areas, particularly around the Baghdad Belts and Diyala Governorate.

American official, Ali Khedery, has been scathing of United States involvement with the militias, stating: "The United States is now acting as the air force, the armory, and the diplomatic cover for Iraqi militias that are committing some of the worst human rights abuses on the planet. These are "allies" that are actually beholden to our strategic foe, the Islamic Republic of Iran, and which often resort to the same vile tactics as the Islamic State itself."

According to The Economist, "the militias Iran is sponsoring are in some ways the Shia mirror-image of the Sunni jihadists of Islamic State (IS)."

See also
Private military company in Iraq
Popular Mobilization Forces

References and notes

External links
IRAQ - PRIVATE MILITIAS MAY KEEP A ROLE| 25-MAY-04| NEW YORK TIMES| Despite pledges by the U.S. military to disband private militias in Iraq, American officials now seem to be resigned to working with them
THE U.S. FAILURE TO DISARM IRAQ'S MILITIAS| New Republic|  11 July 2005
As Violence Escalates, President Bush Assures Iraq of U.S. Support:  Controlling the militias  Streaming video from Online Newshour with Jim Lehrer 16 October  2006
 

Iraq War
Iraqi insurgency (2003–2011)

Politics of Iraq